The Sheikh Jawad Al-Sadiq Mosque or Husseiniyah Mullah Mahmoud was a husseininya-mosque complex located in Tal Afar, Iraq. It is adjacent to the Saad Ibn Aqeel Shrine. The mosque of is named for the ninth Twelver Shi'a Imam, Muhammad al-Jawad and a Sheikh named Mahmoud al-Barzanji. There is also a small cemetery behind the mosque. The mosque is not to be confused with the Mosque of Sayyid Ar-Mahmoud.

Incidents 
On 15 February 2008, two suicide bombers attacked the mosque after the Friday prayers. 17 people were wounded from the attack.

In 2014, the mosque was demolished with explosives by ISIL as part of a plan to destroy Shi'a and Sufi sites in Nineveh governorate. Explosive devices were rigged to the minaret, destroying the mosque. ISIL claimed that these buildings were used to "worship" Husayn.

References 

Destroyed mosques
Mosques in Iraq